Lover Boy is a 1985 Indian Bollywood film produced and directed by Shomu Mukherjee. It stars Rajiv Kapoor in a double role, along with Meenakshi Sheshadri, Anita Raj in pivotal roles.

Cast
 Rajiv Kapoor as Kishan / Kanhaiya (Double Role) 
 Meenakshi Sheshadri as Radha
 Anita Raj as Bijli
 Tanuja as Malti
 Navin Nischol as Prakash
 Kader Khan as Sundarlal
 Om Shivpuri as Rai Sahib
 Indira Gandhi as Self

Soundtrack

References

External links

1980s Hindi-language films
1985 films
Films scored by Bappi Lahiri
Films directed by Shomu Mukherjee
Cultural depictions of Indira Gandhi